William Dearstyne Kellogg (May 25, 1884 – December 12, 1971) was an infielder in Major League Baseball. He played for the Cincinnati Reds.

References

External links

1884 births
1971 deaths
Major League Baseball infielders
Cincinnati Reds players
Cleburne Railroaders players
Baseball players from New York (state)
Sportspeople from Albany, New York